"Favorite Song" is a song by American rapper Toosii, released on February 17, 2023, serving as the lead single from his second studio album. It was produced by ADELSO and Tatiana Manaois. The slow R&B beat with a slowed sample sees Toosii sing about him being the perfect valentine for his partner.

Background
A snippet of the song was first uploaded a snippet of the track to his TikTok profile on January 8, 2022. Following the upload, the song garnered major attention across the platform as Toosii teased a Valentine's Day release if the song gained 100,000 pre-saves.

Composition
"Favorite Song" utilizes a notable sample from the song's producer Tatiana Manaois's November 2022, "You Might As Well." The sample builds the flow for the rest of the track and helps Toosii build the layers of the song in which he sings about his love for his partner and how to treat his partner correctly.

Critical reception
The Music Universes Buddy Iahn noted that on the song, Toosii is "singing directly to those stinging with hurt and yearning for an intuitive, compassionate relationship." Quincy from Rating Game Music described the "romantic" track as "one of those touching tracks that carefully straddles the line between country music and hip-hop music." He concludes his review by stating that "Toosii talks about being a great support system and willing lover to a special someone" and that "by the time you listen to the track two or three times in a row, it will get stuck in your head right next to your Netflix password."

Commercial performance
Debuting with 9.7 million U.S. streams, Toosii's "Favorite Song" debuted at number 51 on the Billboard Hot 100, marking his first entry on the chart. He also made his first appearance on the Billboard Global 200, debuting at number 192 on the chart.

Prior to the song's release, it had gone viral on the video-sharing app TikTok earning over 60,000 videos made using the snippet sound. The track now has over 300,000 videos made to the track on the platform.

Credits and personnel
Credits adapted from Tidal.

 Toosii – vocals, songwriting, recording engineer
 Adelso – co-production, songwriting
 Tatiana Manaois – co-production, songwriting
 Jaycen Joshua – mastering, mixing engineer
 Mike Seaberg – mixing engineer
 DJ Riggins – assistant mixing engineer
 Jacob Richards – assistant mixing engineer
 Rachel Blum – assistant mixing engineer

Charts

References

2023 singles
2023 songs